Liu Tao (born 12 July 1978) is a Chinese actress from Nanchang, Jiangxi. She is known for her roles in Demi-Gods and Semi-Devils (2003), Madame White Snake (2006), Mazu (2012), To Elderly With Love (2013), Nirvana in Fire (2015), Legend of Mi Yue (2015), Ode to Joy (2016) and The Advisors Alliance (2017).

Career
Liu entered the industry in 2000, when she was cast in the family sitcom Daughter-in-Law.

In 2003, Liu was cast in My Fair Princess III, playing the role of Musha. Following the series, Liu rose to fame in China. Her subsequent performance as A'zhu in Demi-Gods and Semi-Devils (2003) made her a household name.

In 2006, Liu starred in Madame White Snake and gained attention for her portrayal of the titular heroine.

Liu challenged her first antagonist role in Da Li Princess (2009) co-starring Ruby Lin. In 2012, she played Mazu in the television series of the same name. The drama gained high ratings during its run and won at the Outstanding Television Series award at the China TV Golden Eagle Award and Flying Apsaras Awards.

Liu's subsequent performance as a capable career woman and housewife in acclaimed melodrama To Elderly With Love (2013) garnered her the Best Actress award at the China TV Golden Eagle Award and the Best Performing Arts Award at the China Golden Eagle TV Arts Festival. The same year, she starred in Good Wife as a mother and housewife who struggles with the challenges of family-life. The family drama was a ratings hit and along with the discussion of Liu's own marital arrangements, became one of the most talked-about topics on Weibo. As a result, Liu gained a surge in popularity.

In 2015, she starred in acclaimed historical-wuxia drama Nirvana in Fire, playing a strong warrior princess. A wax figure based on her role "Ni Huang" was displayed in Beijing Madame Tussauds Wax Museum. The same year, she co-starred in historical drama The Legend of Mi Yue as the antagonist, and won the Best Supporting Actress award at the Shanghai Television Festival.

In 2016, Liu headlined modern romance drama, Ode to Joy, playing a capable but insecure woman. The drama garnered positive reviews and high ratings, and Liu was nominated as Best Actress at the Huading Awards and Shanghai Television Festival.

In 2017, Liu starred in historical drama The Advisors Alliance, portraying Zhang Chunhua, the wife of Sima Yi. The same year, she featured in the crime thriller Peace Breaker and action thriller The Foreigner.

In 2019, Liu reunited with Ode to Joy co-star Yang Shuo in romance melodrama  Hope All is Well with Us.

In 2019, Liu starred in historical drama Poetry of the Song Dynasty, acting for Empress Liu E, the wife of Emperor Zhenzong portrayed by the Taiwanese actor Vic Chou. It is directed by renowned director Li Shaohong. The same year, she starred in the drama film Midnight Diner, based on the Japanese manga of the same name.

Filmography

Film

Television series

Variety show

Discography

Albums

Singles

Awards and nominations

Forbes China Celebrity 100

References

External links

Actresses from Jiangxi
People from Nanchang
1978 births
Living people
21st-century Chinese actresses
Chinese film actresses
Chinese television actresses
Participants in Chinese reality television series